The following list of Malagasy mammal names, compiled and edited by Blench & Walsh (2009), are from Garbutt (1999) unless noted otherwise. The other sources are Beaujard (1998), Goodman & Benstead (2003), Gueunier (1987), and Richardson (1885).

Bats

Feliforms

Bushpigs

Tenrecs

Shrews

Rodents

Primates

See also
List of mammals of Madagascar
Fauna of Madagascar

References

Mammal common names
Malagasy words and phrases
Malagasy
Mammals